Glen Leroy Holloway (September 16, 1948 – December 20, 2011) was an American football guard in the National Football League. He played for the Chicago Bears and Cleveland Browns. He played college football for the North Texas Mean Green.

References

1948 births
2011 deaths
American football offensive guards
Chicago Bears players
Cleveland Browns players
North Texas Mean Green football players
Players of American football from Texas
Sportspeople from Corpus Christi, Texas
Brian Piccolo Award winners